"Cry" is a song by Australian alternative rock group the Mavis's. The song was released in January 1998 as the second single from their second studio album, Pink Pills (1998). The single peaked at number 13 in Australia, becoming the group's highest-charting single.

At the ARIA Music Awards of 1998, "Cry" was nominated for two awards—ARIA Award for Single of the Year, losing to "Torn" by Natalie Imbruglia; and ARIA Award for Song of the Year, but lost to "No Aphrodisiac" by the Whitlams. The song appeared at number 61 on the Triple J Hottest 100, 1998 countdown.

Track listing

Charts

Weekly charts

Year-end charts

Certifications

References

1997 songs
1998 singles
APRA Award winners